Lee Joo-young (born February 14, 1992) is a South Korean actress. Her most notable appearances are in the television series  Weightlifting Fairy Kim Bok-joo (2016–17) and Itaewon Class (2020). She received her first lead role as reporter Seo Jeong-in in OCN triller drama serial Times (2021).

Filmography

Film

Television series

Web series

Web shows

Hosting

Music video appearances

Awards and nominations

References

External links
 
 
 Lee Joo-young on Instagram

1992 births
Living people
South Korean film actresses
South Korean television actresses
Kyung Hee University alumni
21st-century South Korean actresses